Meet My World is a global film campaign, co-produced by Amantani and Andina, based around a series of twelve short films. It focuses on the local skills of the indigenous Quechua children from the Andes of Peru.

Films
Meet My World is a participatory film project developed with indigenous children. There are twelve short films that were directed by Cristina Patiño Sheen and co-produced by Amantani and Andina. The scripts were written and narrated by the twelve children who were featured in the films. In each film, one of the children teaches a local skill from the community.

Film titles
Currently, there are 21 film titles for the campaign with distinct topics in each. They are:
 How to: catch fish with your bare hands - Written by Yuri
 How to: make tamales - Written by Yeni
 How to: plough the land with bulls - Written by Amilcar
 How to: be a shepherdess - Written by Marleni
 How to: dye clothes with vegetables - Written by Magali
 How to: use plants as medicine - Written by Roxana
 How to: make tarwi uchu - Written by Veronica
 How to: make the break of the Incas - Written by Juliana
 How to: build a mud oven - Written by Heidy
 How to: cook guinea pig stew - Written by Angelica
 How to: cook in the middle of nowhere - Written by Doris Sofia
 How to: make and drink chica - Written by Rosa Maria
Weaving rainbows - Written by Roxana
Work hard, play hard - Written by Yeni
Fuel your imagination - Written by Juan de Dios
The horseman - Written by Luis Brayan
Qachun puchay - Written by Soledad
King of the mountains - Written by Yuri
Bottle boarding - Written by Leoncio
Mind's eye - Written by Frank
Reinventing the wheel - Written by Eloy

References

Short film compilations
Peruvian documentary films